Brian Stewart is an American politician and attorney serving as a member of the Ohio House of Representatives from the 12th district.

Early life and education 
Stewart enlisted in the United States Army after graduating from Chillicothe High School in Chillicothe, Ohio. After serving in the infantry during the Iraq War, Stewart returned to Ohio, earning a bachelor's degree and Juris Doctor from Ohio State University.

Political career 
Stewart was elected to Village Council of Ashville, Ohio in November 2009. He earned 23.3% of the vote in the five-way, non-partisan race. In 2012, Stewart ran for Pickaway County, Ohio commissioner. He won the Republican nomination by securing 59.1% of the vote and went on to win the three-way general election with 44.6%. He was reelected to the position in 2016, with 58.3% of the vote.

Stewart was elected to the Ohio House of Representatives in November 2020, succeeding incumbent Republican Ron Hood. He defeated Democrat Charlotte Owens in 2020, winning 72.7% to 27.3%. Less than six months after beginning his term, Stewart announced that he would run for United States Congress, representing Ohio's 15th congressional district.  Stewart dropped out of the race before election day citing a lack of resources.

References

Living people
Republican Party members of the Ohio House of Representatives
Candidates in the 2021 United States elections
21st-century American politicians
People from Ashville, Ohio
1982 births